Rishi Khurana is an Indian television actor. He played Ved in Saas Bina Sasural. Rishi was born as the second son of Gurdev Raj Khurana in Arya Nagar, Lucknow.

He played one episodic role in the TV show Adaalat. He also played a negative role in the TV serial Nimki Mukhiya.

Khurana appeared in Bani – Ishq Da Kalma. He appears in the comedic web series Ladies Driver, produced by Kalpana Khurana. He played the character of Trilochan Roy Chowdhury in Barrister Babu from 2020 to 2021.

Television
 Saas Bina Sasural as Vedprakash Chaturvedi (Ved)
 Chotti Bahu as Birju
 Badalte Rishton Ki Dastaan as Niranjan
 Bani – Ishq Da Kalma
 Savdhaan India (Episode 731)
 Laut Aao Trisha as Inspector Abhay Singh
 Nimki Mukhiya as Rituraj
 Barrister Babu as Trilochan Roy Chowdhury 
 Devon Ke Dev...Mahadev as Nahush
 Gud Se Meetha Ishq as Phool Singh

References

External links
 

Living people
Indian male television actors
Year of birth missing (living people)